This page lists the major power stations located in Sichuan Province.

Non-renewable

Coal-based

Gas-based

Renewable

Hydroelectric
The installed conventional hydropower capacity in Sichuan province has broken through 31,000MW in present. By 2020, The hydropower installed capacity in Sichuan province will increase to over 90,000 MW, accounting for a quarter share of whole Chinese hydropower installed capacity.

Conventional

*Jingping II Hydro Power Station is a Run-of-the-river type of power station. There are 4 water tunnels which are 16.6 km long in average each to divert the water through the Jingping mountains. The deepest point of the tunnel is 2,525 meters from the top of mountain.

Pumped-storage

Wind

References

Power stations
Sichuan